On a Full Moon is the solo debut album by David Bryan from the band Bon Jovi. It is an instrumental CD released on September 5, 1995.

Track listing

References 

1995 debut albums
David Bryan albums